Jo Luck is an American and former  CEO of Heifer International.  She was recognized with a World Food Prize in 2010.

Education 
Luck attended Hendrix College and earned a degree at David Lipscomb College. She also attended the John F. Kennedy School of Government at Harvard University and Harvard Business School's Executive Education Program.

Experience
She joined Heifer International in 1989, serving as director of International Programs from 1989 to 1992 and president from 1992 to July 2011. While president, Luck expanded Heifer International's budget from $7 million to over $100 million.  From 1979-1989, she served as director of the Arkansas Department of Parks and Tourism.  She served as a presidential appointee on the Board for International Food and Agricultural Development (BIFAD), the Farm Foundation’s Dialogue on Food and Agriculture for the 21st Century Steering Committee, and the DuPont Advisory Committee on Agriculture Innovation and Productivity, and as chair of the Program Oversight Panel for CGIAR (Consultative Group on International Agriculture Research) Program on Aquatic Agricultural Systems associated with the World Fish Center.

References

Living people
Hendrix College alumni
Year of birth missing (living people)
Agriculture and food award winners